Barón al rojo vivo is the first live album by the Spanish heavy metal band Barón Rojo. It was recorded in Pabellón de Deportes del Real Madrid with La Pumacrest Mobile on 10 and 11 February 1984.

Track listing

Personnel

Barón Rojo
Armando de Castro - guitar, backing vocals.
Carlos de Castro - guitar, vocals.
José Luis Campuzano "Sherpa" - bass and vocals.
Hermes Calabria - drums

Production
Chris Tsangarides - producer, engineer
Andrew Warwick, Mauricio Gaudenzi - assistant engineers
Artwork By – M. Cuevas
Photography – Linos, Moya
Technician [Cut By] – Arturo Roldán

Certifications

References

1984 live albums
Barón Rojo albums
Spanish-language live albums
Albums produced by Chris Tsangarides